Disco is an unincorporated community in Durham and La Harpe Townships, Hancock County, Illinois, United States.

History
While one source says the etymology is uncertain, another source says Disco was so named because the surrounding river valley is as flat as a discus.

References

Unincorporated communities in Hancock County, Illinois
Unincorporated communities in Illinois